Caravia Alta is one of two parishes in Caravia, a municipality within the province and autonomous community of Asturias, in northern Spain. 

Village and hamlets
 Prado (Prau) (municipal capital)
 La Cantiella
 Cerracín
 Pumarín
 La Rotella
 Bandalisque (Vandalisque)

References

Parishes in Caravia